The image circle is the cross section of the cone of light transmitted by a lens or series of lenses onto the image plane. When this light strikes a perpendicular target such as photographic film or a digital camera sensor, it forms a circle of light – the image circle. Various sensor aspect ratios may be used which all fit inside the same image circle, 3:2, 4:3, 16:9, etc.

A lens to be used on a camera that provides movements must have an image circle larger than the size of the image format (Adams 1980, 54).  To avoid vignetting, a photographer using a view camera must ensure that the area remains within the image circle (Adams 1980, 56–57; 151–52; 157–61); a tilt/shift lens or perspective-control lens used on a small- or medium-format camera usually has mechanical limitations that keep the frame area within the image circle.

See also
Film format
Image sensor format
Format factor

References

 Adams, Ansel. 1980. The Camera. The New Ansel Adams Basic Photography Series/Book 1. ed. Robert Baker. Boston: New York Graphic Society. 
 Ray, Sidney F. 2000. The geometry of image formation. In The Manual of Photography: Photographic and Digital Imaging, 9th ed.  Ed. Ralph E. Jacobson, Sidney F. Ray, Geoffrey G. Atteridge, and Norman R. Axford. Oxford: Focal Press. 
 Ray, Sidney F. 2002. Applied Photographic Optics, 3rd ed. Oxford: Focal Press

Further reading

 Langford, Michael J. Basic Photography, 3rd ed, 63–64. Garden City, NY: Amphoto, 1973. 
 Ray, Sidney F. Photographic Lenses and Optics, 125. Oxford: Focal Press, 1994. 
 Stroebel, Leslie. View Camera Technique, 3rd ed, 62–67. London: Focal Press, 1976. 

Photographic lenses